Mike Keith (born September 11, 1967) is the radio play-by-play voice of the  National Football League’s Tennessee Titans. His signature phrase is an emphatic and raspy "Touchdown Titans!", especially pronouncing "Titans" with a glottal stop after each Titan touchdown, and a loud and drawn out cry of "SSAAAAAAAAAAACCCCCCCCKKKKKKKKK" after every sack.

Early life
Keith’s broadcasting ambitions began at age 7, when his father began taking him to UT football and basketball games. While attending elementary school in Chattanooga, Tennessee, Keith was part of a reading program where he participated in a mock newscast. In 1977, his family moved to Franklin, Tennessee, a Nashville suburb. Keith attended high school at Battle Ground Academy in Franklin. He played a wide receiver, punter and defensive back as a member of the school’s football team.

After high school, Keith attended University of Tennessee. Here, he began his broadcasting career as a student and continued after completing school. From 1987-98, Keith worked for the legendary John Ward with the Vol Radio Network, a network that covered University of Tennessee athletics. From 1989-98, Keith hosted daily sports talk shows on WIVK-AM, a Knoxville, Tennessee radio station, and he covered University of Tennessee sports in Knoxville for WIVK-FM radio and WBIR-TV television.

Tennessee Titans Career
In 1996, Bud Adams, the owner of the National Football League’s Houston Oilers announced he would move his team to Nashville. That same year, while the team was in still in Houston, Keith began hosting a pre-game show for Tennessee stations that carried the Oilers games. He served as the network’s scoreboard host in 1997 before moving into the booth as color analyst in 1998. In 1999, Keith took over the play-by-play duties.

Since taking over the play-by-play role, Keith has consistently announced every Titans touchdown with his signature phrase, "Touchdown Titans!" National media often rerun Titans highlights and capture this phrase within the highlights. Keith's most famous call is that of the Music City Miracle, near the end of his first season as play-by-play announcer. The unbelievable play resulted in a last-minute Titans win that kept them alive in the 1999-2000 NFL Playoffs and eventually led the team to Super Bowl XXXIV.

Since 1999, Keith has won the Tennessee Sportscaster of the Year Award eleven times. He also hosts the television show Titans All Access, in addition to hosting daily Titans updates on Titans Radio, and hosting the weekly Mike Vrabel Show, a radio show which features the Titans' head coach as co-host.

Personal life
Keith is married to his wife Michelle. They have a daughter and a son. He was also the play-by-play radio voice of the Arena Football League's Nashville Kats. He also worked as the public address announcer for Battle Ground Academy’s home football games. Keith’s father, Bill, is president of FirstExpress, a truckload carrier company based in Nashville.

References

American radio sports announcers
National Football League announcers
People from Franklin, Tennessee
Tennessee Titans announcers
College football announcers
Place of birth missing (living people)
Arena football announcers
Tennessee Volunteers football announcers
University of Tennessee alumni
Living people
1967 births